The Columbia 24 Contender is an American trailerable sailboat that was designed by Joseph McGlasson in conjunction with Columbia Yachts and first built in 1963.

The design is a development of the Columbia 24, which, in turn, was a development of the Islander 24.

Production
The design was built by Columbia Yachts in the United States, with 330 boats completed between 1963 and 1968, but it is now out of production.

Design
The Columbia 24 Contender is a recreational keelboat, built predominantly of fiberglass, with wood trim. It has a masthead sloop rig; a spooned, raked stem; a raised counter, angled transom, a keel-mounted rudder controlled by a tiller and a fixed modified long keel, with a cutaway forefoot. It displaces  and carries  of lead ballast.

The boat is normally fitted with a small  outboard motor for docking and maneuvering, mounted in an aft well.

The design has sleeping accommodation for four people, with a double "V"-berth in the bow cabin and two straight settees in the main cabin. A galley was optional. The head is located in the bow cabin, under the "V"-berth.

Operational history
In a 2010 review Steve Henkel wrote, "best features: Although without amenities like a stove, icebox, or stowage space, this basic boat was quite inexpensive for her time, and no doubt drew many new sailors into yachting. Worst features: Although the outboard well is located conveniently close to the cockpit, it is in an unventilated area. Some owners have had trouble with the engine smothering in its own exhaust fumes, unless the hatch is removed or sufficient ventilation is established in some other way."

See also
List of sailing boat types

Related development
Columbia 24
Columbia 24 Challenger

References

External links
Photo of a Columbia 24 Contender

Keelboats
1960s sailboat type designs
Sailing yachts
Trailer sailers
Sailboat type designs by Joseph McGlasson
Sailboat types built by Columbia Yachts